Olegario Lazo Baeza (1878 in San Fernando, Chile – 1964 in Santiago) was a Chilean writer.

Works

Reproduction and back horses, 1915
Military Stories, 1922, brings together 18 stories
New military stories, 1924, contains 14 stories, including the classic Father
Other military stories, 1944
The last gallop, 1944
Men and horses, 1951
Plot, 1957, selected stories

1878 births
1964 deaths
Chilean male writers
Chilean Army officers
Liceo Neandro Schilling alumni